A quick fuck is a layered shooter made from one part coffee liqueur like Kahlua, one part Midori liqueur and one part Baileys Irish Cream. Start with one part coffee liqueur then Midori and finish with Baileys. The Baileys is poured off the back of a bar spoon so it "floats" on top of the midori in a shot glass. Note that Baileys does not have to be used; any type of Irish Cream will do.

There are special machines that can prepare a quick fuck (or other multi-layered cocktails) in only a few seconds, but an experienced bartender usually relies on the traditional, handmade preparation. Cocktails with horizontal layering, like the quick fuck, are called "pousse café". This method of preparation is called "building", as opposed to blending or shaking; thus, quick fucks are "built".

References

Cocktails with fruit liqueur
Shooters (drinks)
Cocktails with coffee liqueur
Cocktails with liqueur